Steve Vijay Lazars (born 14 February 1983) is an Indian-born Irish cricketer. He made his List A debut for North West Warriors in the 2017 Inter-Provincial Cup on 1 May 2017. He made his Twenty20 cricket debut for North West Warriors in the 2017 Inter-Provincial Trophy on 26 May 2017. He made his first-class debut for North West Warriors in the 2017 Inter-Provincial Championship on 20 June 2017.

References

External links
 

1983 births
Living people
Indian cricketers
Irish cricketers
North West Warriors cricketers
Cricketers from Mysore
Indian emigrants to Ireland
Irish people of Indian descent